Summer Hill railway station is located on the Main Suburban line, serving the Sydney suburb of Summer Hill. It is served by Sydney Trains T2 Inner West & Leppington line services.

History

Summer Hill station opened on 15 September 1879. The Main Suburban line through Summer Hill was quadruplicated in 1892, and sextuplicated in 1927 in association with electrification works.

As part of the 1892 work, the northern side platform was converted to an island platform and a new platform constructed on the most northern line. The latter was demolished as part of the 1927 works.

In 2004, Summer Hill was provided with lift facilities which are accessed from the subway. Initial plans called for a new overhead footbridge to access the station however this was opposed by locals on both aesthetic and access grounds, and the plans were subsequently altered to the current arrangement.

Platforms & services

Transport links
Summer Hill station is served by one NightRide route:
N50: Liverpool to Town Hall station

References

External links

Summer Hill station details Transport for New South Wales

Easy Access railway stations in Sydney
Railway stations in Australia opened in 1879
Railway stations in Sydney
Main Suburban railway line